Jean Taylor (born 1944) is an American mathematician.

Jean Taylor may also refer to:

Jean Shinglewood Taylor (1913–2005), British author and a former chairman of the Family Planning Association
Jean Taylor (activist) on Victorian Honour Roll of Women

See also
Jeanne Taylor (1912–1992), American painter and graphic designer
Gene Taylor (disambiguation)